The 1966 Munster Senior Club Hurling Championship was the third staging of the Munster Senior Club Hurling Championship since its establishment by the Munster Council. The championship, which was open to the champion clubs of 1966, began on 19 March 1967 and ended on 20 August 1967.

On 20 August 1967, Carrick Davins won the championship after a 2-17 to 1-11 defeat of Ballygunner in the final at  Clonmel Sportsfield. It remains their only championship title.

Mick Roche from the Carrick Davins club was the championship's top scorer with 3-19.

Results

First round

Semi-finals

Final

Championship statistics

Miscellaneous

 The first round game between Avondhu (North Cork) and Éire Óg, Ennis on 30 April 1966 was the first Munster Championship game to end in a draw.

References

1966 in hurling
Munster Senior Club Hurling Championship